Robert Lee Yates Jr. (born May 27, 1952) is an American serial killer from Spokane, Washington. From 1975 to 1998, he is known to have murdered at least 11 women in Spokane. He also confessed to two murders committed in Walla Walla in 1975 and a 1988 murder committed in Skagit County.

In 2002, Yates was convicted of killing two women in Pierce County and sentenced to death, but it was commuted to life without parole after the Washington Supreme Court ruled capital punishment unconstitutional in 2018. He is currently serving life in prison at the Washington State Penitentiary.

Early life
Yates was born on May 27, 1952, and grew up in Oak Harbor, Washington in a middle-class family. They attended a local Seventh-day Adventist church. Before his birth, his grandmother had murdered his grandfather with an axe in 1945.

Yates graduated from Oak Harbor High School in 1970. In 1975, he was hired by the Washington State Department of Corrections to work as a correction officer at the Washington State Penitentiary in Walla Walla.

In October 1977, Yates enlisted in the United States Army, where he became certified to fly civilian transport airplanes and helicopters. Yates was stationed in various countries outside the continental United States, including Germany, and later Somalia and Haiti during the United Nations peacekeeping missions of the 1990s. Yates also served three years in the Army National Guard as a helicopter pilot from April 1997 through April 2000. He earned several commendation and service medals during his military career, including the US Army Master Aviator Badge.

Yates left the active duty Army in April 1996, apparently a year and a half short of being eligible for his full retirement benefits and pension. At this time, the military was reducing its numbers, so he received full retirement despite being short of the customary 20 years served. He then joined the Army National Guard in April 1997, and served three years until his arrest in April 2000. He served a total of 21.5 years in the military.

He has five children, (four daughters and one son), with second wife Linda, whom he married in 1976. The children's birth years range from 1974 to 1989.

Murders
Yates' first murders were committed in 1975, when he shot and killed two college students who were picnicking. Many of his subsequent victims were prostitutes working along East Sprague Avenue who had substance abuse issues, and Yates would often do drugs with them and other prostitutes. The victims were initially solicited for sex work by Yates, who would have sex with them, (often in his Ford van), then kill them and dump their bodies in rural locations. All of his victims died of gunshot wounds to the head or heart. Eight of the murders were committed with a Raven .25-caliber handgun, and one attempted murder was linked to the same model of handgun. 

On September 19, 1998, Yates was asked to give a DNA sample to Spokane police after being stopped. He refused, stating that it was too extreme of a request for a "family man."

Patrick Allen Oliver and Susan Patricia Savage
On July 14, 1975, the bodies of Patrick Oliver, 21, and Patricia Savage, 22, were found shot in the head near Mill Creek. They were last seen the day before, on their way for an afternoon swim and picnic. 

Stacy Elizabeth Hawn
On December 28, 1988, the partial skeleton of Stacy Hawn, 23, was found near Big Lake. She was last seen on July 7, 1988 in Seattle. Yates confessed to picking up Hawn, who was working as a prostitute, in his van nearby.

Shannon Rene Zielinski
On June 14, 1996, Shannon Zielinski, 38, was found shot in the head in Mead. Her partially nude body was badly decomposed and dumped in a wooded area near a school bus stop. Zielinski had a lengthy criminal record and worked as a prostitute. 

Heather Louise Hernandez
On August 26, 1997, the body of Heather Hernandez, 20, was found in an overgrown lot in Spokane. She was shot five days earlier according to detectives. Hernandez had only recently come to the area and within a few weeks was arrested twice for prostitution.

Jennifer Ann Joseph
On August 26, 1997, Jennifer Joseph, 16, was found shot in the head in a field in Spokane. Police found a brown towel and a brown hair belonging to a white male at the scene. After Joseph's parent's divorce, she dropped out of high school and moved to Tacoma. She started using methamphetamine and became involved in prostitution. She was killed just a month after arriving in Spokane.

Darla Sue Scott
On November 5, 1997, the partially decayed remains of Darla Scott, 29, were found in a shallow grave near a golf course in Spokane. Scott, who had a history of drugs and prostitution, died of a gunshot wound to the head, likely in September or October.

Melinda Lee Mercer
On December 7, 1997, Melinda Mercer, 24, was found shot and dumped in a field in Tacoma; she had been shot several times and had four plastic bags covering her head. At Yates' trial, it was revealed that even after she was shot in the head, Mercer had chewed through two of the bags before succumbing to her injuries. Mercer did not have a criminal record, nor any ties to prostitution, and reportedly worked as a waitress.

Shawn Lynette Johnson
On December 18, 1997, the body of Shawn Johnson, 36, was found with two gunshot wounds and two plastic bags covering her head, about a mile from the remains of Darla Scott. She had been missing since October 29, 1997.

Shawn Ann McClenahan and Laurie Page Wason
On December 26, 1997, the bodies of Shawn McClenahan, 39, and Laurie Wason, 31, were found in a gully in Spokane. Both women were shot twice in the head and their heads were wrapped with three plastic bags each. Wason, who was last seen on November 3, was the devoted mother of a 12-year-old son until a slip with heroin unravelled six years of sobriety; she began working as a prostitute to fund her addiction. McClenahan also struggled with heroin, and was arrested early November for forging a check during a binge. She had been missing since December 18.

Sunny Gail Oster
On February 8, 1998, Sunny Oster, 41, was found shot to death, in an identical manner as McClenahan and Wason, in a rural area of Spokane. Oster, a mother of two, was last seen in October; she disappeared the day after completing a drug treatment program.

Linda Marie Maybin
On April 1, 1998, the remains of Linda Maybin, 34, also known as "Barefoot Linda," was found in Spokane, just 100 yards from the bodies of Shawn McClenahan and Laurie Wason. She was shot once and had two plastic bags covering her head. Maybin, who paid for her crack habit by working as a prostitute, had been missing since November 22, 1997.

Melody Ann Murfin
Sometime in mid-May 1998, Melody Murfin, 43, went missing. She was considered a victim of the same killer, due to her history and association with other victims, but her body was not discovered until six months after Yates' arrest and subsequent confession. She was buried beneath his bedroom window.

Michelyn Joann Derning
On July 7, 1998, Michelyn Derning, 47, was found shot once in the head in Spokane. The .25 caliber bullet casing was still in her hair. She was found nude and partially obscured by a hot tub cover.

Christine Smith
On August 1, 1998, Christine Smith filed a police report for assault and robbery after she was hit in the head during a sex act. She described the man as about 50 years old, 5'10" tall, 175 pounds, with sandy blond hair. His vehicle was described as a 70s era black van with an exterior yellow/orange stripe, bucket seats, wood panelling, and a raised bed. Smith also told police the man told her he was a National Guard helicopter pilot and had five children. Police discovered bullet fragments in her hair; Smith was unaware that she was actually shot. Upon seeing Yates' photo in the newspaper following his arrest, Smith contacted police and identified Yates as the man who assaulted her. She is the only known survivor of Yates' crimes.

Connie Lynn Ellis-LaFontaine
On October 13, 1998, the body of Connie Ellis-LaFontaine, 35, was found in a ditch in Tacoma. She was shot once in the head and had three plastic bags covering her head. She previously worked as a hairdresser in Spokane, but fell into drugs and prostitution six years after she moved, following the death of her son, who was waiting for a heart transplant.

Convictions and appeals
Yates was arrested on April 18, 2000, for the murder of Jennifer Joseph. After his arrest, a search warrant was executed on a white 1977 Chevrolet Corvette that he had previously owned. A white Corvette had been identified as the vehicle in which one of the victims had last been seen. Coincidentally, Yates had been pulled over in this vehicle while the task force was searching for it, but the field interview report was misread as saying "Camaro", not "Corvette," thus the incident was not realized until after Yates had been arrested.

After searching the Corvette, police discovered blood that they linked to Jennifer Joseph, and DNA from Yates that they then tied to 12 other victims. In 2000, he was charged with 13 counts of first-degree murder and one count of attempted first-degree murder in Spokane County Superior Court. As part of a plea bargain, Yates confessed to the murders to avoid the death penalty. He was sentenced to 408 years in prison. Charges were dropped without prejudice in the murder of Shawn McClenahan so that, if Yates appealed his other guilty sentences, he could be tried for her murder and possibly sentenced to death. Following his sentencing hearing, Yates made a statement apologizing to the families of all the victims he had killed.

In 2001 Yates was charged in Pierce County, Washington, with the murders of two additional women. The prosecution sought the death penalty for the deaths of Melinda L. Mercer in 1997, and Connie Ellis in 1998, which were thought to be linked to the killings in Spokane County. On September 19, 2002, Yates was convicted of those murders and subsequently sentenced to death by lethal injection on October 3, 2002.

The 2002 death sentence was appealed on grounds that Yates believed his 2000 plea bargain to be "all-encompassing", and that a life sentence for 13 murders and a death sentence for two constituted "disproportionate, freakish, wanton and random" application of the death penalty. The arguments were rejected in 2007 by the Washington Supreme Court. A September 19, 2008 execution date was stayed by Chief Justice Gerry L. Alexander pending additional appeals.

In 2013, Yates's attorneys filed a habeas corpus petition in federal district court, stating that Yates is mentally ill and, "through no fault of his own ... suffers from a severe paraphilic disorder" that predisposed him to commit murder. The still-pending motion is regarded as a "long shot" by most observers. "I don't think Mr. Yates helps his cause by relying on the fact that he's a necrophiliac," said Pierce County Prosecutor Mark Lindquist.

Yates remains incarcerated at the Washington State Penitentiary. His case was further complicated by Washington Governor Jay Inslee's 2013 declaration that he would not sign death warrants for anyone on death row while he is in office. Inslee cited the high cost of the appeals process, the randomness with which death sentences are sought, and a lack of evidence that the penalty serves as a deterrent to other criminals.

In July 2015, the Washington Supreme Court once again rejected an effort by Yates to overturn his conviction and death sentence. After the Washington State Supreme Court ruled in 2018 that the death penalty violated the state constitution, Yates's death sentence, as well as that of Washington's other death row inmates, was commuted to life in prison without the possibility of parole.

Victims
Yates had killed the following individuals:

See also 
 List of serial killers in the United States
 List of serial killers by number of victims
 Donna Perry (serial killer)

References

Works cited

External links
Robert Lee Yates, Jr. Archived from Crime Library
Kari & Associates – Robert Lee Yates, Jr.
Profile from Radford University Dept of Psychology students Archived

1952 births
American aviators
American male criminals
American murderers of children
American people convicted of murder
American prisoners sentenced to death
American serial killers
Crimes against sex workers in the United States
Living people
Male serial killers
Necrophiles
People convicted of murder by Washington (state)
People from Spokane, Washington
People from Walla Walla, Washington
Prisoners sentenced to death by Washington (state)
United States Army personnel of the Gulf War
United States Army soldiers
Violence against women in the United States